Fleming Island is a small island in Northern Saskatchewan, Canada; surrounded by Cree Lake.

In 2008, Titan Uranium conducted exploration drilling on the island looking for uranium, building on earlier exploration activities conducted by other mining companies on the island.

References

Uninhabited islands of Saskatchewan
Lake islands of Saskatchewan